Contos may refer to:

Currency
Conto, the unofficial multiple of the Portuguese escudo: 1 conto meant 1,000$00, 2 contos meant 2,000$00 and so on.
Contos de réis, one million réis (or one thousand mil-réis, written 1.000$000) of the Portuguese real

Arts
Contos (Eça de Queiroz), a collection of short stories by the Portuguese writer Eça de Queiroz. It was first published in 1902, two years after his death.

People
Contos (surname)